Sibsagar Town railway station  is a railway station on the Lumding–Dibrugarh section. It is located in Sivasagar in the Indian state of Assam. Its code is SRTN. It serves Sibsagar city. The station consists of one platforms.

Survey for 344 km (214 mi)-long new line from Jorhat to Shibsagar was completed in 2010–11.

Trains

The following trains stop at Sibsagar Town:

 05915/05916 Simaluguri - Dibrugarh Town Passenger Special
 55909/55910 Simaluguri - Dibrugarh Town Passenger
 15641/15642 Barak – Brahmaputra Express
 15669/15670 Guwahati – Dibrugarh Town Nagaland Express
 15927/15928 Rangiya – New Tinsukia Express
 22501/22502 New Tinsukia – SMVT Bengaluru Weekly Superfast Express

Also See 

 Simaluguri Junction railway station

References 

Railway stations in Sivasagar district
Tinsukia railway division
Transport in Sibsagar